Statesman is a novel by Piers Anthony published in 1986.

Plot summary
Statesman is a novel in which Hope Hubris offers liberal solutions to political problems.

Reception
Dave Langford reviewed Statesman for White Dwarf #96, and stated that "It's the execution which is dire, with its humourless efforts to characterise all women by their performance in bed with hero Hope Hubris, and the extremely ad-hoc nature of the solutions."

Reviews
Review by Anthony Low (1987) in Fantasy Review, March 1987

References

1986 novels